The Roman Catholic Diocese of Sumbawanga is a diocese located in Sumbawanga in the Ecclesiastical province of Mbeya in Tanzania.

History
 1880: Established as the Apostolic Vicariate of Tanganyika from the Apostolic Vicariate of Central Africa in Sudan
 May 10, 1946: Renamed as Apostolic Vicariate of Karema 
 March 25, 1953: Promoted as Diocese of Karema 
 October 24, 1969: Renamed as Diocese of Sumbawanga
 December 21, 2018: Changed metropolia from Tabora to Mbeya

Leadership
 Vicars Apostolic of Tanganyika (Roman rite) -- see also separate article Apostolic Vicariate of Tanganyika
 Bishop Jean-Baptiste-Frézal Charbonnier, M. Afr. (1887.01.14 - 1888.03.1616)
 Bishop Léonce Bridoux, M. Afr. (1888.06.15 Jun 1888 - 1890.10.20)
 Bishop Adolphe Le Chaptois, M. Afr. (1891.06.19 - 1917.11.30)
 Bishop Joseph-Marie Birraux, M. Afr. (1920.04.22 - 1936.04.22), appointed Superior General of Missionaries of Africa (White Fathers)
 Bishop Jan Cornelius van Sambeek, M. Afr. (1936.11.19 - 1947.05.10), appointed Vicar Apostolic of Kigoma
 Vicar Apostolic of Karema (Roman rite) 
 Bishop James Holmes-Siedle, M. Afr. (1946.07.29 – 1953.03.25 see below)
 Bishops of Karema (Roman rite)
 Bishop James Holmes-Siedle, M. Afr. (see above 1953.03.25 – 1958.08.05), appointed Bishop of Kigoma
 Bishop Charles Msakila (1958.11.13 – 1969.10.24 see below)
 Bishops of Sumbawanga (Roman rite)
 Bishop Charles Msakila (see above 1969.10.24 – 1994.02.23)
 Bishop Damian Kyaruzi (1997.04.21 - 2018.04.19)
 Bishop Beatus Christian Urassa (since 2018.04.19)

See also
Roman Catholicism in Tanzania

Sources
 GCatholic.org
 Catholic Hierarchy

Sumbawanga
Sumbawanga
Sumbawanga
Sumbawanga, Roman Catholic Diocese of
1946 establishments in Tanganyika